The Emamzadeh Pir Davoud is an Imamzadeh in Ghamsar, Iran. It is said that it is the burial place of Davoud, Ali's grandson. The Imamzadeh is located in a pleasant and verdant spot in the north of Ghamsar adjacent to dense gardens. The structure was built in the Safavid era. The structure has a conical dome, which is decorated by turquoise tiles. The grave of the Imamzadeh is located in a wooden housing.

See also 
List of historical structures in Isfahan Province

References 

Architecture in Iran